The Parts of Kesteven ( or ) are a traditional division of Lincolnshire, England.  This division had long had a separate county administration (quarter sessions), along with the two other Parts of Lincolnshire, Lindsey and Holland.

Etymology
The word Kesteven is supposed to have derived from two root words: the Celtic  meaning wood (compare Modern Welsh ) and the Old Norse , a meeting place. The earliest record of the place-name is c1000 and was spelt , developing into  by 1185.

Administrative areas

Wapentakes and Sokes
Historically, Lincolnshire was divided into wapentakes, hundreds and sokes. The following made up Kesteven:

 Aswardburn Wapentake
 Aveland Wapentake
 Beltisloe Wapentake
 Boothby Graffo Wapentake
 Flaxwell Wapentake
 Langoe Wapentake
 Lovedon Wapentake
 Ness Wapentake
 Winnibriggs and Threo Wapentake
 Borough and Soke of Grantham
 Stamford Borough

Local Government Act 1888 
The three parts were given separate elected county councils in 1889 by the Local Government Act 1888, and recognised as administrative counties.  Kesteven lies in the south-west of Lincolnshire.  It includes the towns of:

 Bourne
 Bracebridge
 Grantham
 Market Deeping
 Sleaford
 Stamford

Local Government Act 1894
Under the Local Government Act 1894 Kesteven was divided into a number of rural district and urban districts based on earlier sanitary districts:

Bourne Rural District
Branston Rural District
Grantham Rural District
Claypole Rural District
Sleaford Rural District
Uffington Rural District

The urban districts and boroughs were:
Bourne
Bracebridge
Grantham (borough)
Ruskington
Sleaford
Stamford (borough)

Bourne Urban District was abolished in 1920, with Bourne becoming a parish in Bourne Rural District.  Bracebridge became part of the county borough of Lincoln that same year, becoming associated with the Parts of Lindsey.

Local Government Act 1929
The rural districts were re-organised by a County Review Order in 1929, to create four new districts named after points of the compass:

East Kesteven Rural District
North Kesteven Rural District
South Kesteven Rural District
West Kesteven Rural District

Local Government Act 1972
These separate county councils were abolished in 1974 and Lincolnshire (minus the northern part of Lindsey) had a single county council for the first time, although the names of the Parts survive in some of the names of district councils. Under the Local Government Act 1972, the four rural districts in Kesteven, along with the boroughs and urban district, merged into two district councils:

North Kesteven District Council - A merger of North and East Rural Districts and Sleaford Urban District
South Kesteven District Council - A merger of South and West Rural Districts and the boroughs of Grantham and Stamford

Titles of nobility associated with Kesteven
 The title of Baron Kesteven existed from 1868 until 1915.
 The title of Duke of Ancaster and Kesteven existed from 1715 to 1809.
 Margaret Thatcher, former Prime Minister of the United Kingdom and Kesteven native, chose 'of Kesteven' as territorial designation for her life peerage in 1992, becoming Baroness Thatcher, of Kesteven in the County of Lincolnshire.

See also
Parts of Lindsey
Parts of Holland
Rutland
Huntingdonshire
Isle of Ely
Soke of Peterborough

References

External links
Map of Kesteven on Wikishire

 
Geography of Lincolnshire
History of Lincolnshire
Local government in Lincolnshire
Administrative counties abolished in 1974